So Sim-hyang (born on 1 July 1992) is a freestyle wrestler from North Korea. She competed in 48 kg division, but in 2013 she moved to the 51 kg division. She was the gold medalist at the 2010 Asian Games and three times Asian Championships bronze medalist. She also has two world Championship bronze medals under her name. So is also considered the best female wrestler of North Korea. She represents the Amnokgang Sports Team.

References

1992 births
Living people
North Korean female sport wrestlers
Wrestlers at the 2010 Asian Games
Asian Games medalists in wrestling
World Wrestling Championships medalists
Asian Games gold medalists for North Korea
Medalists at the 2010 Asian Games
Asian Wrestling Championships medalists
21st-century North Korean women